The Week The Women Went is a 2012 reality series narrated by Jeff Foxworthy on the Lifetime Channel and produced by BBC Worldwide Productions. The show is an American version of a BBC show of the same name.

Premise
The show follows the town of Yemassee, South Carolina as all of the adult women in the community leave for a week. The men are then left on their own to take on the responsibilities of the women, which includes childcare, house cleaning, and employment.

Episodes

Reception and criticisms
Hit Fix criticized the show's premise of being a "social experiment", stating that it felt more like a sitcom, that it perpetuated stereotypes of both men and Southerners, and that "losing fifty percent of the adults in town is going to create a hardship, regardless of whether they're male or female". Other criticisms focused on the helplessness of the men in the show, with one person stating that "I get that it is supposed to be a fish out of water story ... but if you have a 9-year-old daughter and you cannot brush her hair, you aren't a fish out of water. You are a bad father".

References

External links

2010s American reality television series
2012 American television series debuts
Lifetime (TV network) original programming
English-language television shows
Women in South Carolina